Lockeport Regional High School (LRHS) is a secondary school located in Lockeport, Nova Scotia. LRHS is part of the Tri-County Regional School Board and is the only high school in the town of Lockeport.

Administration 

Jackie Treloar - Principal

External links
LRHS
Tri-County Regional School Board

High schools in Nova Scotia
Schools in Shelburne County, Nova Scotia